Melaleuca stenostachya, commonly known as fibre-barked teatree or straight teatree is a plant in the myrtle family Myrtaceae and is native to the Cape York Peninsula in northern Australia, the gulf country of the Northern Territory and the south of Papua New Guinea. It is closely related to Melaleuca dealbata but can be distinguished from that species by the wide separation of the flowers in the inflorescence.

Description
The leaves also have 5 to 7 longitudinal veins.

The flowers are creamy-white in colour and are arranged in spikes at the ends of branches which continue to grow after flowering, and sometimes in the upper leaf axils. The stamens are arranged in five bundles around the flower, each bundle containing 6 to 10 stamens.

Taxonomy and naming
Melaleuca stenostachya was first formally described in 1968 by Stanley Thatcher Blake in Contributions from the Queensland Herbarium. The specific epithet (stenostachya) is from the Ancient Greek stenos meaning "narrow" or "tight" and stachys meaning "a spike" or "an ear of grain" referring to the narrow flower spike.

Distribution and habitat
This melaleuca occurs in the Borroloola district in the Northern Territory, Cape York Peninsula and southern parts of Papua New Guinea. It grows in seasonal swamps and along creeks in a variety of soils.

References

stenostachya
Myrtales of Australia
Flora of Queensland
Plants described in 1968